The 62nd Orange Bowl was a post-season college football bowl game between the Florida State Seminoles and the Notre Dame Fighting Irish on January 1, 1996, at The Orange Bowl in Miami, Florida. Florida State defeated Notre Dame, 31-26. The game was part of the 1995-1996 Bowl Alliance of the 1995 NCAA Division I-A football season and represented the concluding game of the season for both teams. The Orange Bowl was first played in 1935, and the 1996 game represented the 62nd edition of the Orange Bowl. The contest was televised in the United States on CBS.

This would be the last Orange Bowl played in the Orange Bowl Stadium until 1999, as the next three were played in Pro Player Stadium, before moving the game there permanently after the 1999 season.

Florida State capped off this Orange Bowl with their 14th straight bowl game without a loss (December 1982 through January 1996).

Referee Jimmy Harper of the Southeastern Conference retired after calling his fourth Orange Bowl in 13 seasons, including the legendary 1984 game which saw the Miami Hurricanes win the first of their five national championship by upending then-No. 1 Nebraska 31-30.

References

External links
New York Times article
Notre Dame recap

Orange Bowl
Orange Bowl
Florida State Seminoles football bowl games
Notre Dame Fighting Irish football bowl games
Bowl Alliance
1996 in sports in Florida
1990s in Miami
January 1996 sports events in the United States